Jeanne d'Arc station is a stop on Ottawa's Transitway. It is located at the interchange of Regional Road 174 and Jeanne d'Arc Boulevard in Orleans in the east end of the city of Ottawa.

In 2025, as part of Stage 2 of Ottawa's light-rail transit system, the Confederation Line will be extended east from Blair station to Trim station, making Jeanne d'Arc one of the 16 new LRT stations on the alignment. The current Transitway station is going to be converted to light rail, connecting the city from east to west.

While this stop existed for several years as a connection point between local routes in Orleans and Route 95 (now Route 39), OC Transpo had identified it as an official station starting in Fall 2006 and the construction of a new transit station by 2009, according to its transitway map.

A small park and ride facility opened in 2006 south of the eastbound lanes near Youville Drive. However, one must travel across the Jeanne d'Arc overpass to get access to the westbound stop.

Service

The following routes serve Jeanne d'Arc:

References 

2006 establishments in Ontario
2009 establishments in Ontario
Railway stations scheduled to open in 2025
Transitway (Ottawa) stations